Viswam Engineering College(Formerly Sir Vishveshwaraiah Institute of Science and Technology) also known as VISM is an Indian state college. It is located in Madanapalle, Annamayya district, Andhra Pradesh, India.

It is affiliated to Jawaharlal Nehru Technological University, Anantapur. It is also an ISO 9001:2015 certified institution. The society is involved in improving both the primary and secondary education of the rural poor in this area.

History
Viswam Engineering College was established in 2006. It was promoted by the Viswam Educational Society and registered in the year 1991. Under its influence, the society evolved from LKG to PG since 1991. The required approvals from AICTE, New Delhi and affiliation from JNTU, Anantapur were obtained.

Campus

Campus facilities include labs, workshops, computer centers, library, an information center and indoor and outdoor sports venues. Transport facilities are available to students and staff via 10 buses.

Academics
The college admits undergraduate students through the annual state-wide EAPCET exam. It offers Bachelor of Technology (BTech) courses in multiple disciplines and post-graduate courses. Besides it provides facilities for attending workshops on topics that avail students a great opportunity to progress in every opportunity they utilize. The Master of Technology (MTech) course is offered to Structural Engineering, Software Engineering, Machine Design, Embedded Systems. The college also offers Master of Business Administration (MBA) courses through its department of management.

Courses 

Viswam Engineering College course offerings have expanded to meet students' educational needs and interests. The following programs are offered:

Under Graduation: B.Tech
 Civil Engineering – 90 Seats
 Electrical & Electronics Engineering – 60 Seats
 Mechanical Engineering – 90 Seats
 Electronics & Communications Engineering – 120 Seats
 Computer Science & Engineering – 120 Seats

Post Graduation: M.Tech
 Structural Engineering (CE) – 18 Seats
 Software Engineering (CSE) – 18 Seats
 Machine Design (ME) – 18 Seats
 Embedded Systems (ECE) – 18 Seats

Post Graduation: Management Studies Courses
 Master of Business Administration – 240 Seats

Extra-curricular activities

Sports
Every year an Inter-Department Fest, an inter-department sports competition is held. Sports in the Fest are basketball, football, cricket, badminton, volleyball, kabaddi, handball, throwball and track and field. Indoor games include carroms, chess and table tennis.  Tournaments match Viswam Engineering College with other colleges.

NSS unit
The main activities of the NSS unit are Plantation, Blood donation camp, services at orphanages and old age homes, road safety and anti-ragging squads, medical camps in villages, environmental awareness and programs, services to physically and mentally challenged people, issue of Voter ID cards (students and staff), first aid training and fire drills.

Placement cell  
The Viswam Engineering College placement cell was established in 2006 with the objective of creating career opportunities for promising students in companies.

The training and placement wing facilitates contacts between companies and engineering and management graduates. It ensures that students have the information and skills necessary for an effective job search.

References

Engineering colleges in Andhra Pradesh
Educational institutions established in 2006
2006 establishments in Andhra Pradesh